The Giro delle Marche was a single-day road cycling race held annually in Marche, Italy from 1941 to 1942 and from 1968 to 1976.

Winners

References

Cycle races in Italy
Classic cycle races
Recurring sporting events established in 1941
1941 establishments in Italy
1976 disestablishments in Italy
Recurring sporting events disestablished in 1976
Defunct cycling races in Italy